For Woman's Favor is a lost 1924 silent film drama directed by O. A. C. Lund and starring Seena Owen and Henry Hull.

Cast
Seena Owen - June Paige
Elliott Dexter - Howard Fiske
Wilton Lackaye - Bracken
Irma Harrison - The Lamb
Henry Hull - The Fool/The Lover
Paul McAllister - The Wolf
Arthur Donaldson - The Brother

References

External links
 For Woman's Favor at IMDb.com

1924 films
Lost American films
American silent feature films
American black-and-white films
Silent American drama films
1924 drama films
1924 lost films
Lost drama films
Films directed by Oscar A. C. Lund
1920s American films
1920s English-language films